Lieutenant Colonel Reginald Leonard Haine  (10 July 1896 – 12 June 1982) was an English recipient of the Victoria Cross, the highest and most prestigious award for gallantry in the face of the enemy that can be awarded to British and Commonwealth forces.

First World War service
Haine was 20 years old, and a second lieutenant in the 1st Battalion, Honourable Artillery Company, British Army during the First World War when the following deed took place for which he was awarded the VC.

On 28/29 April 1917 near Gavrelle, France, when British troops were holding a salient which was being repeatedly counter-attacked by German forces, Second Lieutenant Haine organised and led six bombing attacks against a German strong point and captured the position, together with 50 prisoners and two machine-guns. The enemy at once counter-attacked and regained the lost ground, but Second Lieutenant Haine formed a "block" in his trench and for the whole of the following night maintained his position. Next morning he again attacked and recaptured the position. His splendid example inspired his men during more than 30 hours of continuous fighting.

He can be heard recounting some of his First World War experiences in Peter Jackson's film They Shall Not Grow Old.

Haine was later attached to the 35th Sikhs, Indian Army and was awarded the Military Cross for his actions on the North West Frontier of India at Dakka, 17 May 1919.

He is remembered on the Imperial War Museums' site We remember Reginald Leonard Haine.

Subsequent career

He later achieved the rank of lieutenant colonel and commanded a Home Guard battalion during the Second World War. In later life he became a chartered accountant.

Medal
The medal has been loaned by the family to the Imperial War Museum in London. A copy is on display at Headquarters, Honourable Artillery Company, Armoury House, London.

References

External links
Imperial War Museums interview with Haine, 1973
Location of grave and VC medal (West Sussex)
 

1896 births
1982 deaths
British Army personnel of World War I
British Army recipients of the Victoria Cross
British Indian Army officers
British World War I recipients of the Victoria Cross
English accountants
Honourable Artillery Company officers
People from Wandsworth
20th-century English businesspeople